A River Sutra is a collection of stories written by Gita Mehta and published in 1993. The book's stories are interconnected by both a geographical reference (the Narmada River and the Narmada River Valley), and by the theme of diversity within Indian society, both present and past. Unlike some of Mehta's previous stories, the ones in A River Sutra feature only Indian characters.

Introduction 
A River Sutra is a novel by Gita Mehta that was published in 1993 by Random House of Toronto, Canada. It has received the greatest attention of all of Mehta's work, among other classics such as Karma Cola (1979) and Snakes and Ladders (1979). It is considered an accurate representation of Indian Culture, as it covers much of the culture of India, through its portrayal of music, religion, and major landmarks. The story is told in mid-to-late 20th century India and is set around the Narmada River in central India.

The story is told from the perspective of a retired bureaucrat who interacts with a variety of travellers and residents of the area, whose stories are relayed to the reader through a series of vignettes. Through these stories, the major themes of love, the Narmada River, desire, the human heart, lust, and religion are explored.

References

External links
 Madhuri Bite, "An Exploration of Narrative Technique in Gita Mehta's A River Sutra", The Criterion: An International Journal in English, Vol. II. Issue II, June 2011.

Indian short story collections
1993 short story collections
Narmada River
Books about India